Major General Frank Butner Clay (February 26, 1921 – December 30, 2006) was a United States Army officer. He was the son of General Lucius D. Clay Sr. and the brother of General Lucius D. Clay Jr. He is buried at Arlington National Cemetery along with his first wife, Patricia Adams Casey Clay (November 1, 1923 – January 1, 1973). Patricia Clay was the sister of Major Hugh Boyd Casey, who was killed in an airplane crash while serving as an aide-de-camp to the 3d Infantry Division Commander during the Korean War. They were, in turn, the children of Major General Hugh John Casey of the Army Corps of Engineers, who was the West Point roommate and good friend of General Lucius D. Clay Sr.

Clay attended the Valley Forge Military Academy and graduated from Millard Prep School. Appointed to the United States Military Academy from New York state, he graduated with a B.S. degree in May 1942. Clay later graduated the Command and General Staff College in 1952 and the National War College in 1961.

General Clay served in various positions from World War II through the Vietnam War.  In 1971, he was a military advisor to the US delegation to the Paris peace talks.  General Clay retired from the Army in 1973. He became the Deputy Assistant Secretary of Defense for Drug and Alcohol Abuse on July 11, 1973.

He died at the Knollwood Military Retirement Residence in Washington, D.C. and is buried along with his first wife at Arlington National Cemetery.

Awards and decorations
He was awarded the Distinguished Service Medal, the Silver Star with two Oak Leaf Clusters, the Legion of Merit, the Distinguished Flying Cross, the Bronze Star Medal with V and two Oak Leaf Clusters and the Purple Heart with Oak Leaf Cluster.

References

1921 births
2006 deaths
People from Auburn, Alabama
Valley Forge Military Academy and College alumni
United States Military Academy alumni
Military personnel from Alabama
United States Army personnel of World War II
Recipients of the Silver Star
United States Army Command and General Staff College alumni
National War College alumni
United States Army personnel of the Vietnam War
Recipients of the Air Medal
Recipients of the Distinguished Flying Cross (United States)
Recipients of the Legion of Merit
United States Army generals
Recipients of the Distinguished Service Medal (US Army)
Nixon administration personnel
Military personnel from Washington, D.C.
Burials at Arlington National Cemetery